Bullialdus is a lunar impact crater located in the western part of the Mare Nubium. It was named after French astronomer Ismaël Boulliau. To the north by north-west is the broken-rimmed and lava-flooded crater Lubiniezky. South-west of Bullialdus lies the smaller crater König.

The relatively isolated location of this crater serves to highlight its well-formed shape. Bullialdus has a high outer rim that is circular but observers have noted a slightly polygonal appearance. The inner walls are terraced and contain many signs of landslips. The outer ramparts are covered in a wide ejecta blanket that highlights a radial pattern of low ridges and valleys.

In the center of the crater is a formation of several peaks and rises that climb to over a kilometer in height. A raised ridge runs from the peaks to the south-east, until finally merging with the inner wall. The floor of the crater is generally rough with many low rises. Overall it has a somewhat convex shape, bulging upward toward the middle. When the Sun is at a high angle, the rim and central mountains appear brighter than the surroundings, and white patches can be viewed on the crater floor.

Infrared studies of the crater region have revealed at least three layers of strata. The impact may also have intersected a mafic pluton, which means a crystallized body of igneous rock that has high concentrations of heavier elements (such as magnesium, in this case).

Two smaller but notable craters lie just to the south of the main crater. Bullialdus A lies just to the south-west of Bullialdus, within its ramparts. To the south of Bullialdus A is the slightly smaller Bullialdus B.

Satellite craters
By convention these features are identified on lunar maps by placing the letter on the side of the crater midpoint that is closest to Bullialdus.

References

 S. Tompkins et al., "Distribution and geologic history of materials excavated by the lunar crater Bullialdus", Twenty-Fourth Lunar and Planetary Science Conference, Part 3, 1993.

External links
Central Peak of Bullialdus Crater, Lunar Reconnaissance Orbiter Camera, Posted by Samuel Lawrence on May 11, 2010.
Bullialdus Central Peak Oblique, Lunar Reconnaissance Orbiter Camera, Posted by Sarah Braden on January 23, 2013.

 
 
 
 
 

Impact craters on the Moon